John O'Neill (8 January 1777 – 1854) was an Irish writer, poet and playwright.

He was born into a poor family in Waterford. At the age of nine he was apprenticed to a relative, who was a shoe-maker. In 1798 he was living in Carrick-on-Suir, where he married. He wrote a number of popular songs around this time, the best-known being a satire, "The Clothier's Looking-Glass". He next went to London, where he formed a large circle of acquaintances, among them George Cruikshank, who illustrated some of his poems ("The Drunkard", 1840, "The Blessings of Temperance", 1851, "The Triumph of Temperance", 1852). He wrote Alva, a drama, in 1821 and he enjoyed some popularity as a temperance poet. His business ventures were not successful and he  had a large family to support. At the end of his life, he was also working as a shoe-maker in Drury Lane. His last book, "Legends of Carrick" (edited by Mrs. S. C. Hall), was published in 1854.

References

1777 births
1854 deaths
Irish poets
People from County Waterford
Irish dramatists and playwrights
Irish male poets
Irish male dramatists and playwrights